Rippig is a village in the commune of Bech, in eastern Luxembourg.  , the village has a population of 109.

Echternach (canton)
Villages in Luxembourg